Chawky Frenn is a Lebanese-born American artist, author, and art professor. He currently teaches art at George Mason University in northern Virginia. His highly realistic paintings have strong narrative social and political elements. Frenn is a former Fulbright scholar, and currently resides in the Greater Washington, D.C. area.

Early life and education 
Chawky Frenn was born in Zahlé, Lebanon. Frenn immigrated to the United States in 1981 and lived for several years in Boston, where he studied art and received a BFA from the Massachusetts College of Art and Design in Boston, Massachusetts, in 1985 and completed his MFA at Tyler School of Art of Temple University in Philadelphia, Pennsylvania, and at Temple Abroad in Rome, Italy, in 1988.

He has taught art at Bridgewater State College in Bridgewater, Massachusetts; Montserrat College of Art in Beverly, Massachusetts; and Edinboro University of Pennsylvania in Edinboro, Pennsylvania. He is currently an associate professor at George Mason University in Fairfax, Virginia, where he received a Teaching Excellence Award in 2009.

Exhibitions 
Frenn has exhibited widely in the United States, Europe, the Middle East, and his work has been widely reviewed by major newspapers and significant art critics. His work has been exhibited at the Hoyt Institute of Fine Arts in New Castle, Pennsylvania; Housatonic Museum of Art in Bridgeport, Connecticut; Erie Art Museum in Erie, Pennsylvania; Arnot Art Museum in Elmira, New York; and the Sursock Museum in Beirut, Lebanon.

Frenn's paintings are also in the permanent collection of The Housatonic Museum of Art in Bridgeport, Connecticut and the Springfield Museum of Art in Springfield, Ohio.

Solo exhibitions 
 1985     Raison d'Etre. Tower Gallery, Massachusetts College of Art and Design. Boston, MA
 1987     The Quest. Tyler Gallery, Tyler School of Art. Philadelphia, PA
 1988     Your Tragedy is Mine. Temple Abroad Gallery. Rome, Italy
 1988     Your Tragedy is Mine. Basilica San Lorenzo Maggiore. Milan, Italy
 1991     Active Meditation. Laura Knott Gallery, Bradford College. Bradford, MA
 1991     Dolls' Heads. Goforth Rittenhouse Galleries. Philadelphia, PA
 1992     A Living Trail. McKillop Gallery, Salve Regina University. Newport, RI
 1993     Shared Solitude. The Lowe Gallery. Atlanta, GA
 1993     Reckless Peace. Alif Gallery. Washington, DC
 1994     Big. Works of Surprising Size and Impact. The Art Center in Hargate, St. Paul's School. Concord, NH
 1995     Art for Life's Sake. Carnegie Arts Center. Covington, KY
 1996     Tomb to Womb. Anderson Gallery, Bridgewater State College. Bridgewater, MA
 1996     Sacra Conversazione. Bromfield Gallery. Boston, MA
 1997     Sacra Conversazione. Olaf Clasen Gallery. Cologne, Germany
 1997     Silence. Galerie Septentrion. Marcq-en-Baroeul, France
 1998     Wandering. Voss Gallery. Düsseldorf, Germany
 2003 – 04  For Show or For Sure? Upper Jewett Exhibition Corridor, Dartmouth College. Hanover, NH
 2000     Thanatos and Eros. Passions Gallery. Provincetown, MA
 2000–02 Ecce Homo. Traveling exhibition: Housatonic Museum of Art
 Johnson Center and Fine Arts Galleries, George Mason University. Fairfax, VA. Jan 15 – Feb 9, 2001
 The Art Center in Hargate, St. Paul's School. Concord, NH. Jan 11 – Feb 9, 2002
 Sarrat Gallery, Vanderbilt University. Nashville, TN. Nov 2 – 27, 2000
 The Hoyt Institute of Fine Arts. New Castle, PA. Apr 24 – May 25, 2001
 2002     Thanatos and Eros. Horizon Gallery. Santa Fe, NM
 Housatonic Museum of Art. Bridgeport, CT. Jun 8 – Jul 20, 2001
 Erie Art Museum. Erie, PA. Sep 22 – Dec 28, 2001
 2002     The Holy Cost. Fraser Gallery. Bethesda, MD
 2004     US and THEM. Fraser Gallery. Bethesda, MD
 2005     What is Truth? Washington Theological Union. Washington, DC
 2006     Art for Life's Sake. The Art Center, American University of Beirut. Beirut, Lebanon
 2006     Human, Not Too Human. Fraser Gallery. Bethesda, MD
 2007     Missa Pro Pace. Arlington Arts Center. Arlington, VA
 2009     Can humankind save itself? Lamar Dodd Art Center, LaGrange College. LaGrange, GA
 2012     Introspection: The Universal In The Personal. Cynthia Nouhra Art Gallery. Beirut, Lebanon
 2012     Be the change you seek! BlackRock Center for the Arts. Germantown, MD
 2013     We the People. Hess Gallery, Pine Manor College. Chestnut Hill, MA
 2014     We the People. Nestor Gallery. Milton Academy, Milton, MA

Museum exhibitions and international art fairs 
 1986 National April Salon. Springville Museum of Art. Springville, UT
 1987 Harrisburg Arts Festival. State Museum of Pennsylvania. Harrisburg, PA
 National April Salon. Springville Museum of Art. Springville, UT
 1989 Springfield Art League 70th Annual Exhibition. Springfield Museum of Fine Arts and George Walker Vincent Smith Art Museum. Springfield, MA
 1991 Tenth Annual September Competition. Alexandria Museum of Art. Alexandria, LA
 Juried Exhibition. Attleboro Museum. Attleboro, MA
 1992 ANA 21. The Holter Museum of Art. Helena, MT
 1993 28th Annual Exhibition. The Fine Arts Institute of the San Bernardino County Museum. Redlands, CA
 Winter International Competition. The Florida Museum of Hispanic and Latin American Art. Miami, FL
 1994 Hoyt National Art Show. The Hoyt Institute of Fine Arts. New Castle, PA
 Staten Island Biennial. Staten Island Institute of Arts and Sciences. Staten Island, NY
 1995 XIX Salon d’Automne. Sursock Museum. Beirut, Lebanon
 30th Annual Exhibition. The Fine Arts Institute of the San Bernardino County Museum. Redlands, CA
 1997 XXI Salon d’Automne. Sursock Museum. Beirut, Lebanon
 1998 XXII Salon d’Automne. Sursock Museum. Beirut, Lebanon
 16th Annual September Competition. Alexandria Museum of Art. Alexandria, LA
 New Voices/New Visions. New The Alternative Museum. New York, NY
 16th Contemporary Art Fair. ArtBrussels. Represented by Voss Gallery. Brussels, Belgium
 2001–02 Re-presenting Representation 5. Arnot Art Museum. Elmira, NY
 2001 Housatonic Museum of Art, Bridgeport, CT
 2002 The Affordable Art Fair. Gescheidle. New York, NY
 2004 20th Contemporary Art Fair. MAC 2000. Espace Champerret. Paris, France
 2005 73rd Annual Cumberland Valley Artists Exhibition. Washington County Museum of Fine Arts. Hagerstown, MD
 2006 Slow Painting: A Determined Renaissance. Oglethorpe University Museum of Art. Atlanta, GA
 2007 Aachen to Arlington / Arlington to Aachen: Imaging the Distance. Ludwig Forum für Internationale Kunst. Aachen, Germany. Curators: Harold Kunde, Director of the Ludwig Forum für Internationale Kunst, Claire Huschle and Carol Lukitsch.
 ARTDC Washington First Annual International Modern & Contemporary Art Fair. April 27–30 Washington Convention Center. Washington, DC
 Exhibition 280. Huntington Museum of Art. Huntington, WV
 Convergence: New Art From Lebanon. The Katzen American University Museum. Washington, DC
 2012 Galvanized Truth – A Tribute to George Nick. Duxbury Art Complex Museum. Duxbury, MA
 2013 Beirut Art Fair. September 19–22. Cynthia Nouhra Art Gallery. Beirut International Exhibition & Leisure center (BIEL). Beirut, Lebanon
 Beirut Bloom Contemporary Art Fair. April 17–27. Cynthia Nouhra Art Gallery. Artheum. Beirut, Lebanon
 2014 Beirut Art Fair. September 19–21. Cynthia Nouhra Art Gallery. Beirut International Exhibition & Leisure center (BIEL). Beirut, Lebanon
2019 Radius 250, March 22 – April 21, 2019. Art Space, Richmond, VA.
2021 Inside Outside, Upside Down, July 17 – September 12, 2021. The Phillips Collection, Washington, DC.

Books 
Frenn is the author of the following books
 100 Boston Artists Atglen, PA: Schiffer Books. 
 100 Boston Painters Atglen, PA: Schiffer Books. 
 Art for Life's Sake Fine Arts Consulting and Publishing. 
 Ecce Homo Nassar Design: Beirut, Lebanon.

Reviews 
A New York Times review in 2001 described him as "a painter who has nailed down the figurative mode, and this accomplishment gives him the license to convey anything he wants, including the grand theme: the elusive meaning of human existence.”

A Washington Post review in 2004 added that Frenn is "an artist's artist (as opposed to a critic's artist)." In that same year, in discussing an exhibition of Frenn's works at Darmouth The Lebanon Daily Star newspaper noted that "you might think it would take a lot to upstage an artist like Damien Hirst, but earlier this year Chawky Frenn did so with ease."

American art critic Donald Kuspit wrote that "He constructs a spiritual space in which the contemporary public can feel emotionally at home, however troubling the emotions his imagery evokes in them."

Washington Life Magazine described Frenn in 2009 as an "influential metro area visual artist."

References

External links 
 
 Vision Series: "Chawky Frenn – “Art and Social Justice”, Lecture, George Mason University Television, February 4, 2013

Living people
20th-century American painters
21st-century American painters
American male painters
Modern painters
Artists from Washington, D.C.
Lebanese American
Lebanese artists
Artists from Boston
Painters from Washington, D.C.
George Mason University faculty
Temple University Tyler School of Art alumni
Massachusetts College of Art and Design alumni
Artists from Virginia
Arab-American culture in Washington, D.C.
Writers from Washington, D.C.
Lebanese writers
Year of birth missing (living people)
Montserrat College of Art faculty
20th-century American male artists